Correctio filialis de haeresibus propagatis (Latin: "Filial correction concerning propagated heresies") is an August 11, 2017 petition initially by 62 critics of Pope Francis, who argued that the pope propagated heresies, with regard to seven theological issues the authors identified in Amoris laetitia, an apostolic exhortation by Pope Francis dated March 29, 2016 and in other related statements. The authors released the twenty-five page document to the public on September 24, 2017, stating they had received no response from the Holy See.

Summary 
The seven alleged corrections of doctrines and practices concerned:
 Assertion that God's grace is not invariably sufficient for the justified person's ability to remain free from all serious sin 
 Possibility of individuals' civil divorce and remarriage to another, and subsequently living as if married, but not placing themselves in a state of mortal sin as a result
 Ability to possess full knowledge of a divine law, yet voluntarily break it in a serious matter without placing oneself in a state of mortal sin as a result
 Ability to sin against God by keeping a divine prohibition 
 Possibility of morally sanctioned sexual acts within a civil marriage, when one or both parties are within a sacramental marriage to another
 Assertion that revealed divine law or natural law principles do not absolutely prohibit some behaviors as objectively grave and unlawful
 Providing the Eucharist to individuals divorced and remarried to another; providing absolution to individuals divorced and remarried absent their contrition

Notable signers
Those signing the document included:
Andrew Pinsent – Research Director of the Ian Ramsey Centre for Science and Religion at the University of Oxford
John-Henry Westen – former candidate for the New Reform Party of Ontario
Martin Mayer – Writer
Gerard J. M. van den Aardweg – European editor of the Empirical Journal of Same-Sex Sexual Behavior
Bernard Fellay – then Superior General of the Society of Saint Pius X
Robert Brucciani – District Superior of Great Britain & Scandinavia, Society of Saint Pius X 
Christopher Ferrara Esq. – Founding President of the American Catholic Lawyers’ Association
Ettore Gotti Tedeschi – Former President of the Institute for the Works of Religion (IOR), Professor of Ethics at the Catholic University of the Sacred Heart, Milan
Martin Mosebach – Writer and essayist
Guy Pagès – Diocesan Priest
John Rao – Associate Professor of History, St. John's University, NYC; Chairman, Roman Forum
Joseph Shaw – Tutor in moral philosophy, St Benet's Hall, Oxford.

Reactions
Vatican secretary of state, Cardinal Pietro Parolin, indirectly addressed the controversy, advocating for those who disagree with the Pope to dialog with the church and "find ways to understand one another."

Mariano Fazio, the vicar general of Opus Dei, said that issuance of such a correction was wrong, and that the signers "scandalize the whole Church."

References

External links
 CorrectioFilialis.org

21st-century Catholicism
2017 in Christianity

Catholicism-related controversies
Traditionalist Catholicism